Torbay  is a borough and unitary authority in Devon, south west England. A popular tourist destination, Torbay's sandy beaches, mild climate and recreational and leisure attractions have given rise to its nickname of the "English Riviera".

History

Human bones and tools found in Kents Cavern in Torquay show that people have inhabited the Torbay area since Paleolithic times. A maxilla fragment known as Kents Cavern 4 may be the oldest example of a modern human in Europe, dating back to 37,000–40,000 years ago. Roman soldiers are known to have visited Torquay during the period when Britannia formed a part of the Roman Empire; they left offerings at a curious rock formation in Kent's Cavern, known as "The Face". A Roman burial was discovered in 1993 in Paignton.

Both Brixham and Paignton appear in the Domesday Book of 1086, and Paignton was given the status of a borough having a market and fair in 1294. The first major building in Torquay was Torre Abbey, a Premonstratensian monastery founded in 1196 and associated with the manor of Torre.

William, Prince of Orange (afterwards King William III), landed in Brixham on 5 November 1688, during the Glorious Revolution, and issued his famous declaration "The Liberties of England and The Protestant Religion I Will Maintain".

Torquay's economy, like Brixham's, initially depended on fishing and agriculture, but in the early 19th century the area began to develop into a fashionable seaside resort, initially frequented by members of the Royal Navy during the Napoleonic Wars while the Royal Navy anchored in Tor Bay and later, as the town's fame spread, by Victorian society.

The historic part of Paignton lies inland: salt marsh formerly occupied the low-lying coastal fringe. Kirkham House is a late-medieval stone house and the Coverdale Tower adjacent to Paignton Parish Church is named after Miles Coverdale, who published an English translation of the Bible in 1536 and became Bishop of Exeter in 1551. Paignton remained a small fishing village until the early 19th century; a new harbour was built here in 1837.

A new phase in the urban expansion of the area began when Torre railway station opened in December 1848. The railway extended to Torquay Seafront station in 1858, to Paignton in 1859 and to Brixham in 1861. As a result of its expansion, Torquay was granted borough status in 1872, and 1902 saw its first marketing campaign to summer tourists.

Torbay Golf and Country Club (now defunct) opened in 1933. The club and course closed in the mid-1950s.

Tor Bay hosted the sailing events for the 1948 Summer Olympics in London.

The County Borough of Torbay, established in 1968 by the amalgamation of the Municipal Borough of Torquay, Urban District of Paignton and Urban District of Brixham, also took in parts of the civil parishes of Coffinswell and Kerswells from Newton Abbot Rural District and Churston Ferrers and Marldon from Totnes Rural District. The County Borough became the Borough of Torbay under local government reorganisation in 1974. It became a unitary authority on 1 April 1998, making it separate from Devon County Council but shares ceremonial duties with the county council.

In the 1970s Torbay had problems with substance abuse and people living in poor conditions in houses of multiple occupation.

Governance
The area is represented nationally at the House of Commons by two MPs. Torquay (along with part of Paignton) is in the Torbay parliamentary constituency which was created in 1974 and was won by Kevin Foster for the Conservatives in 2015 having been held by Adrian Sanders of the Liberal Democrats from 1997 to 2015. Brixham and part of Paignton fall within the Totnes constituency, which is also represented by a Conservative, Anthony Mangnall. Until Brexit in 2020, Torbay was in the South West England constituency of the European Parliament, together with the rest of South West England and Gibraltar.

Between 2005 and 2019, Torbay Council was headed by the Mayor of Torbay, the first directly elected mayor in the South West region. Conservative candidate Nicholas Bye who won in October 2005, under the supplementary vote electoral system which was later described as "a total failure" with Bye receiving votes from fewer than 7% of the electorate. However, running as an independent he was defeated in the May 2011 election by Gordon Oliver who stood as a Conservative. Oliver was re-elected in 2015.

For local elections, the district is divided into 16 wards. The Council elects 36 councillors in elections held every four years. Since the 2019 United Kingdom local elections the council has been under no overall control. The composition as of 3 May 2019:

Geography

There are three main towns around the marine inlet of Tor Bay: Torquay in the north, Paignton in the centre, and Brixham in the south. These have become connected over the years, swallowing up villages and towns such as St Marychurch, Cockington, Churston Ferrers and Galmpton, though the latter maintains a rural feel thanks to tight conservation measures. The borough of Torbay is bordered by the South Hams to the south and west, and by Teignbridge to the north. Nearby towns include Totnes and Dartmouth in the South Hams, and Newton Abbot and Teignmouth in Teignbridge.

The southern limit of Tor Bay is Berry Head, and the northern limit is Hope's Nose, although Torquay itself stretches further north into Babbacombe Bay, where the beaches at Oddicombe, Babbacombe and Maidencombe can be found; these are noted for their interesting Breccia cliffs. Torbay's many geological features have led to the establishment of the English Riviera Geopark; as of July 2008, this is the sole urban geopark of the 53 geoparks worldwide.

Because of the mild climate, Torbay palm trees are a common sight along the coast. However, these are in fact not palms but Cordyline australis, originating from New Zealand where it is known as "cabbage tree". These trees also flourish elsewhere in the UK. It is suggested that the popularity of cabbage trees in Torbay is attributable to their first being introduced to the UK in that region.

Settlements

Torbay includes:

Torquay including suburbs
Paignton including suburbs
Brixham including suburbs
Broadsands
Churston Ferrers
Galmpton
Goodrington

Demography
The 2011 census confirmed Torbay's reputation as a retirement area, with a higher proportion of all age groups over the age of 50 than nationally. However compared to 2001, age groups 75-79 and 80-85 both showed a decline of around 4%, compared to increases of 1.5% and 14% for the whole country.

Some other statistics from the 2011 census:

Economy
Torbay's main activities are public service; serving its large retired community such as in hospitality, construction and repairs; tourism; the transport sector including boats; distribution; retail; fishing; the digital, media and arts sector. It has a few established schools and accredited teachers/hosts for the short-term study of English as a foreign language.

The fishing port of Brixham is home to one of England and Wales' most successful fishing fleets and regularly lands more value than any UK port outside Scotland. It is also a base for Her Majesty's Coastguard and the Torbay Lifeboat Station.

Torbay has been twinned with Hameln in Lower Saxony, Germany since 1973; and with Hellevoetsluis in the Netherlands since 1989.

Deprivation and urban renewal

The Melville Street, Warren Road, Rock Road and Coburg Place area of Torbay, also known as Melville Hill, has experienced deprivation and violence since the 1970s. This is an historic area with 44 Grade II listed buildings.

In 2013, a Healthwatch report for the council found that the area had high levels of houses in multiple occupation, "a fairly transient community" and heavy drug use. The report stated that Melville Hill had "a historic reputation as a dumping ground for transient, out of work single people with chaotic lifestyles", but that most residents felt it was a friendly area. In 2014, the council said that the area had "significant challenge ... from car parking, poor quality public realm, bin storage, rat running, ASB, HMOs, lack of community space/play area, links to the town centre". In 2015, the local health authority noted that residents had a lower life expectancy than in other areas of Torbay, that the proportion of people in the area who had mental ill health or learning disabilities were high, that the suicide rate was higher than elsewhere in the South West, and that many residents were either unemployed or earnt low wages.

The local authority first set up a "Making Melville Marvellous" project to support urban renewal in 2013, but this did not lead to results. In 2020 the local authority identified £100,000 of funding from adult social care to start the project again. The aims include supporting people who misuse substances, improving the quality of housing and developing community.

Education

Transport
Torbay is beyond the motorway network and is primarily served by the A38 and A380 roads from Exeter to Tweenaways Cross, Paignton, which is dualled each way (save for a single carriageway flyover at Penn Inn roundabout), as far as Churscombe Cross.

Torbay's other main road links are the A379, which follows a coastal route from Teignmouth, passes through Torquay and Paignton, then goes on to Dartmouth; and the A385 road which goes inland to Totnes. The A3022 road serves all three towns and varies from dual carriageway and single carriageway.

The bus franchise is largely operated by Stagecoach South West. The other bus company operating throughout Torbay is Local Link.

Torbay has three stations on the National Rail network, operated by Great Western Railway: Torre railway station is inland on the road from Torquay to Newton Abbot, Torquay railway station is close to Torre Abbey Sands and Paignton railway station serves that town and links with the heritage Dartmouth Steam Railway to Kingswear, connecting via the Dart ferry to Dartmouth.

A new station at Edginswell was planned to open in December 2018 as part of the proposed Devon Metro but lack of funding prevented construction. Approval of planning permission expired November 2019, but a new application for funding was made in June 2020 for a new design incorporating lifts instead of ramps. If government funding is approved a new planning application would be made. The station was awarded £7.8m from the New Stations Fund in November 2020.

Notable people
Famous former residents of Torbay include authors Agatha Christie (who set many of her novels in a thinly disguised version of the borough), Charles Kingsley, Edmund Gosse and Rudyard Kipling; Peter Cook, comic (half of a famous comedy team with Dudley Moore); the industrialist and architect of the nearby Atmospheric railway, Isambard Kingdom Brunel; prog-rock band Wishbone Ash; supermodel Lily Cole; and comedian Jim Davidson. Former tennis player Sue Barker originates from the area.

Explanatory notes

References

External links

 Torbay Council
 The Official Tourist Board
 

 
Non-metropolitan districts of Devon
Olympic sailing venues
Populated coastal places in Devon
Unitary authority districts of England
Venues of the 1948 Summer Olympics
Boroughs in England